The Battle of Bretton Woods: John Maynard Keynes, Harry Dexter White, and the Making of a New World Order is a 2013 non-fiction book by Dr. Benn Steil.

It covers the 1944 conference that established the architecture of the postwar international monetary system, leading to the establishment of the International Monetary Fund and the World Bank, the substance of the negotiations, and especially the roles of the key players, most notably the famous British economist John Maynard Keynes and Harry Dexter White, the U.S. Treasury official who led the American negotiating team. The book sheds light on how White got to dominate economic policy and was influential in the postwar economic order.

References

2013 non-fiction books
Books about capitalism
Books about economic history
Books about John Maynard Keynes
World Bank
International Monetary Fund
Works about the World Bank
Works about the International Monetary Fund
Princeton University Press books